Events from the year 1730 in art.

Events
 Pope Clement XII commissions Nicola Salvi to renovate the Trevi Fountain

Works
 Canaletto
 The Bacino di San Marco (National Museum Cardiff)
 The Grand Canal and the Church of the Salute
 The Molo Looking East
 Venice: the Grand Canal with S. Maria della Salute towards the Riva degli Schiavoni (British Royal Collection, Windsor Castle)
 Rosalba Carriera – Flora
 William Hogarth
 A Children's Party
 A House of Cards
 Henry Scheemakers – Memorial to Sir Francis Page and Frances, Lady Page (Steeple Aston church, Oxfordshire) 
 Enoch Seeman – Portrait of King George I
 Hamlet Winstanley – Portrait of Bishop Edward Waddington

Births
 January 15 – Mauro Antonio Tesi, Italian painter, active mainly in Bologna (died 1766)
 January 22 – Johan Edvard Mandelberg, Swedish-born painter (died 1786)
 April 1 – Solomon Gessner, Swiss painter and poet (died 1788)
 April 11 – Josef Kramolín, Czech fresco painter (died 1802)
 July 12 – Josiah Wedgwood, English potter (died 1795)
 July 31 – Charles-Antoine Bridan, French sculptor (died 1805)
 September 19 – Augustin Pajou, French sculptor (died 1809)
 November 2 – Giovanni Battista Casanova, Italian painter and printmaker (died 1795)
 November 3 – Pierre-Simon-Benjamin Duvivier, French engraver of coins and medals (died 1819)
 date unknown
 Jacques-François Amand, French historical painter (died 1769)
 James Basire, English engraver who apprenticed William Blake (died 1802)
 Antonio Capellini, Italian engraver (died unknown)
 Niccolò Carissa, Italian painter of still-life specimens of flowers, vegetables, and birds (died unknown)
 Teodor Kračun, Serbian painter, active mainly in North Serbia (died 1781)
 Niccolò Lapiccola, Italian painter (died 1790)
 Dionigi Valesi,  Italian printmaker active in Verona and Venice (died 1780)
 Min Zhen, Chinese painter and seal carver born in Nanchang in Jiangxi (died 1788)
 probable
 (b. 1730/1738): Aleijadinho, colonial Brazil-born sculptor and architect (died 1814)
 (b. 1730/1732): Carl-Ludwig Christinek, Russian painter (died 1794)
 Alexander Bannermann, English engraver (died unknown)
 George Barret, Sr., Irish landscape artist (died 1784)
 Gabriele Bella, Italian Baroque painter (died 1799)
 Robert Carver, Irish painter especially of theater scenery (died 1791)
 Dorning Rasbotham, English writer and painter (died 1791)

Deaths
 February 12 – Luca Carlevarijs or Carlevaris, Italian painter of landscapes (vedutista) (born 1663)
 February 26 – Johann Peter Alexander Wagner, Rococo sculptor (died 1809)
 March 30 – Jaime Mosen Ponz, Spanish painter (born 1671)
 July 18 – Tommaso Dossi, Italian painter from Verona (born 1678)
 October 25 – Johann Michael Rottmayr, Austrian painter (born 1656)
 October 29 – Jean Louis Petitot, French enamel painter (born 1652)
 October 30 – Antonio Cifrondi, Italian painter of genre works (born 1655)
 November 10 – Gregorio Lazzarini, Italian painter of religious subjects and those from history and mythology (born 1657)
 November 21 – François de Troy, French painter, father of Jean-François de Troy (born 1645)
 December – Alida Withoos, Dutch botanical artist and painter (born 1661/1662)
 date unknown
 Giovanni Paolo Castelli, Italian still-life painter, active in Rome (born 1659)
 Huang Ding, Chinese landscape painter and poet during the Qing Dynasty (born 1650)
 Giovanni Girolamo Frezza, Italian engraver (born 1659)
 Giovanni Battista Parodi, Italian fresco painter (born 1674)
 Sieuwert van der Meulen, Dutch painter (born 1663)
 Marc van Duvenede, Flemish painter (born 1674)
 François-Alexandre Verdier, French painter, draftsman and engraver (born 1651)
 probable
 Pietro Nelli, Italian portrait painter (born 1672)
 Clemente de Torres, Spanish Baroque painter of Genoese origin (born 1662)

References

 
Years of the 18th century in art
1730s in art